Elections to Comhairle nan Eilean Siar (Western Isles Council) were held on 4 May 2017, the same day as the other Scottish local government elections. The election was the third one using the nine wards created under the Local Governance (Scotland) Act 2004. Each ward elected three or four Councillors using the single transferable vote system: a form of proportional representation. A total of 31 Councillors were elected.

As in the previous election in 2012, Independent Councillors retained a large majority of the seats on the Council and retained control of the administration.  For the first time in the council's history no women were elected, resulting in it becoming Scotland's only local authority without any female representation.

Election result

Note: "Votes" are the first preference votes. The net gain/loss and percentage changes compare with the previous Scottish local elections on 3 May 2007. These figures may differ from other published sources showing gains/losses in comparison with the seats held at the dissolution of the council in 2012.

Ward results
The wards are listed below in English.

Barraigh, Bhatarsaigh, Eirisgeigh agus Uibhist a Deas
2012: 2xIndependent; 1xSNP; 1xLab
2017: 2xIndependent; 2 SNP
2012-2017 Change: SNP gain 1 seat from Labour

Beinn Na Foghla agus Uibhist a Tuath
2012: 2xIndependent; 1xLab
2017: 3xIndependent
2012-17 Change: Independent gain 1 seat from Labour

Na Hearadh agus Ceann a Deas Nan Loch
2012: 1xIndependent; 1xSNP; 1xLab
2017: 2xIndependent; 1xSNP
2012-2017 Change: Independent gain 1 seat from Labour

Sgir’ Uige agus Ceann a Tuath Nan Loch
2012: 2xIndependent; 1xSNP
2017: 2xIndependent; 1xCon
2012-2017 Change: Conservative gain 1 seat from SNP

Sgire an Rubha
2012: 3xIndependent
2017: 3xIndependent
2012-2017 Change: No change

Steòrnabhagh a Deas
2012: 3xIndependent; 1xSNP
2017: 3xIndependent; 1xSNP
2012-2017 Change: No change

Steòrnabhagh a Tuath
2012: 3xIndependent; 1xSNP
2017: 3xIndependent; 1xSNP
2012-2017 Change: No change

Loch a Tuath
2012: 2xIndependent; 1xSNP
2017: 2xIndependent; 1xSNP
2012-2017 Change: No change

An Taobh Siar agus Nis
2012: 3xIndependent; 1xSNP
2017: 3xIndependent; 1xSNP
2012-2017 Change: No change

Changes since 2017
On 23 July 2020, Na Hearadh agus Ceann a Deas Nan Loch Independent Councillor Finlay Cunningham stepped down from the Council. A by-election to replace him was held on 8 October 2020 and was won by Independent candidate Grant Fulton.

By-elections since 2017

Ward areas in English

Barraigh, Bhatarsaigh, Eirisgeigh agus Uibhist a Deas (ward): Barra, Vatersay, Eriskay and South Uist
Beinn Na Foghla agus Uibhist a Tuath (ward): Benbecula and North Uist
Na Hearadh agus Ceann a Deas Nan Loch (ward): Harris and South Lewis
Sgir' Uige agus Ceann a Tuath Nan Loch (ward): Mid Lewis
Sgire an Rubha (ward): Eye Peninsula (locally known as "Point")
Steòrnabhagh a Deas (ward): Stornoway South
Steòrnabhagh a Tuath (ward): Stornoway North
Loch a Tuath (ward): Broad Bay
An Taobh Siar agus Nis (ward): North West Lewis (West Side & Ness)

References

External links
 Council website
 Candidates list

2017
2017 Scottish local elections